The Rajiv Gandhi International Cricket Stadium, also colloquially known as Hyderabad Cricket Stadium is a cricket stadium in Hyderabad, Telangana, India. Located in the eastern suburb of Uppal, it has a maximum capacity of 55,000 and extends across 15 acres of land. It serves as the home ground for the Hyderabad Cricket Association and the Indian Premier League team Sunrisers Hyderabad. As of 18 January 2023, it has hosted 5 Tests, 7 ODIs, and 3 T20Is. This stadium hosted the opener and final of 2017 Indian Premier League, and also the final of 2019 Indian Premier League.

It is named after the former prime minister of India Rajiv Gandhi.

History

HCA's previous home ground was the Lal Bahadur Shastri Stadium in the Fateh Maidan sports complex at Basheerbagh in central Hyderabad. The ground belonged to the Sports Authority of Telangana State and HCA had limited operating autonomy over this ground.

Moreover, due to its smaller size, it soon came to be known as a high-scoring ground and so Hyderabad was not considered for many high-profile cricket matches in India.

In 2003, the proposal for a new stadium was submitted by HCA to the government of erstwhile Andhra Pradesh, then headed by N. Chandrababu Naidu. The proposal was quickly cleared and HCA was allocated a budget for the same. The government also identified a large piece of land suitable for the project at Uppal.

Most of the funding for the project came after an open auction of the stadium's title was held. Visaka Industries Limited won the auction with a bid price of ₹65,00,00,000. A sum of ₹43,00,00,000 was paid in advance and the stadium was named Visakha International Cricket Stadium in 2004.

By 2005 when most of the stadium was built, it was ready to host its first ODI Match between India and South Africa. However, Y. S. Rajasekhara Reddy the former Chief Minister of Andhra Pradesh(before the separation of Telangana) decided to change the name of the stadium to Rajiv Gandhi International Cricket Stadium in memory of the former Prime Minister of India Rajiv Gandhi.

Following this decision, HCA was required to pay Visakha Industries six times the contract price in accordance with the contract clauses governing any subsequent renaming of the stadium or the Visakha name not remaining attached to the stadium. HCA however, following some negotiations by Govt, got away with paying an amount of ₹43,00,00,000, i.e. the contract price only.

The ends are named Pavilion End and North End. On the retirement of VVS Laxman, the HCA decided to honor the veteran by naming the North End after him.

Stats and records 

 Matches Hosted
 Test — 5
 ODI — 7
 T20I — 3

Records
 Bangladesh played their first ever test in India at this venue since they got their test status in 2000 when Bangladesh toured India in 2017.

Ground capacity and factors 
 
 The stadium extends across  and has a seating capacity of 55,000 spectators. The ends are Pavilion End and North End (V.V.S. Laxman end).
 A stand was named after Newly appointed Hyderabad Cricket Association President Mohammad Azharuddin and opened on 6 December 2019.
 Floodlights are mounted on six towers to illuminate the stadium during day-night matches having been commissioned in April 2007.
 The wicket here is considered a flat track, with a reputation of being a batsman-friendly and high-scoring pitch.

Franchise cricket  

Sunrisers Hyderabad is a cricket franchise based in Hyderabad city. The team is owned by Kalanithi Maran of the Sun TV Network.
Aiden Markram is the captain of the team. Brian Lara is the head coach and Simon Helmot is the assistant coach of the team. Dale Steyn and Muttiah Muralitharan are the bowling coaches of the team. The team won the 2016 IPL. So far this stadium is served as the home ground of the Sunrisers and now defunct franchise Deccan Chargers.

Its official jersey was unveiled on 8 March 2013, and the team anthem directed by GV Prakash Kumar was released on 12 March 2013. Their logo was unveiled on 20 December 2012, along with the announcement that the team's management would be led by Kris, Tom Moody, and VVS Laxman.

In IPL 2019, Hyderabad Cricket Association won the award for best ground and pitch.

Records 

 Highest Total: 231/2 – Sunrisers Hyderabad vs. RCB, 31 March 2019
 Highest Individual Score: 126 – David Warner, Sunrisers Hyderabad vs. KKR, 30 April 2017
 Best Bowling Figures: 6/12 – Alzarri Joseph, Mumbai Indians vs. Sunrisers Hyderabad, 6 April 2019

Alzarri Joseph's bowling figures of 6 for 12 are the best recorded in any IPL match.

Test cricket
It was the 101st venue for Test matches in world cricket.

Stadium records
 Umesh Yadav recorded his first 10 wicket haul in his Test career at this ground on 12 October 2018 against West Indies.
 Ravichandran Ashwin recorded the first 10-wicket haul in Tests at this ground on 23 August 2012 against New Zealand.

Test matches records

One-day international cricket

Stadium records
 Australia had scored 350/4, it is the highest score at the stadium.
 England had scored 174, it is the lowest score at the stadium.
 Yuvraj Singh's 233 scored in three matches is the most of runs scored at the stadium.
 Shubman Gill's 208 is the highest individual score at the stadium.
 Sachin Tendulkar completed 17,000 ODI runs, made his 45th ODI century and received his 60th ODI Man of the match award.
 697 runs made for the loss of 14 wickets in one match.
 India completed its 500th ODI win at this venue in 2019.

One day international records

T-20 Internationals
The ground was scheduled to host its first-ever Twenty20 International on 13 October 2017, against Australia. However, it was called off due to a wet outfield.

The ground finally hosted a Twenty20 International on 6 December 2019, against West Indies. It was a high-scoring match, with India winning the match by 6 wickets. Team India played the 3rd T20 against Australia on September 25th, 2022, at this venue. India won by 6 wickets and won the Mastercard T20I trophy against Australia. Surya Kumar Yadav who scored 69 runs (36 balls) is awarded the Player of the Match.

Stadium records
 27 sixes were witnessed in one match, it's the most sixes in a T20I game in India
 416 runs were scored in one match for the loss of 9 wickets.
 K. L. Rahul reached his 1000 runs milestone in a T20I at this venue.

Twenty20 international records

References

External links

 Cricinfo Website - Ground Page

Sports venues in Hyderabad, India
Cricket grounds in Telangana
Cricket in Hyderabad, India
Sports venues in Telangana
Test cricket grounds in India
Sports venues completed in 2003
2003 establishments in Andhra Pradesh